Dr. Sanaullah Abbasi PSP is a Pakistani civil servant and police officer who serves as the Director General of the Federal Investigation Agency, in office since 14 June 2021.
He also served as inspector general of Khyber Pakhtunkhwa Police from 2 January 2020 to 8 June 2021.

References

Living people
IGPs of Khyber Pakhtunkhwa Police
Pakistani police officers
Year of birth missing (living people)
Directors General of the Federal Investigation Agency
Pakistani civil servants
Pakistani government officials